Adrianna Jean Bertola (born 9 February 1999) is an English actress and singer who rose to attention playing Gretl von Trapp in The Sound of Music and Sharice Brooks in Casualty. She also played Violet Beauregarde in Charlie and the Chocolate Factory the Musical from May to November 2013.

On 22 September 2014, Bertola released her first single, titled "Fire and Ice", through the Spirit Young Performers Company.

Early life 
Adrianna Jean Bertola was born on 9 February 1999 in Southend-on-Sea, Essex. She is of Italian descent.

Career 
Bertola's first appearance was in The Sound of Music where Bertola played the role of Gretl von Trapp and received a standing ovation on the opening performance. At the time she was signed up to the Morgan Academy for Performing Arts. Bertola then appeared in Les Misérables as Young Cosette. Bertola's next role was in Casualty where Bertola played Sharice Brooks, a recurring character throughout series 23 of the long-running medical drama. In 2010, Bertola played the titular role of Matilda in the Stratford Production of Matilda the Musical  where she shared the role with two other young actresses; Kerry Ingram and Josie Griffiths. She also sang the song 'Quiet' for the Matilda the Musical Original Soundtrack. During her run received favourable reviews.  However, due to her height, Bertola was unable to transfer to the West End production. In 2011, Bertola played Brigitta Von Trapp in a tour of The Sound of Music. She also appeared in Jessie J's music video of Who's Laughing Now, in which she played the younger version of Jessie J and has subsequently been dubbed as 'Mini Jessie J'. Bertola currently attends the Sylvia Young Theatre School. Adrianna was in  the West End production of Charlie and the Chocolate Factory the Musical playing Violet at the Theatre Royal, Drury Lane until her contract ran out on 12 November 2013.

Discography

Singles 

 Fire and Ice

Filmography

Film and Television

Theatre

References

External links 

1999 births
Living people
English television actresses
English stage actresses
English child actresses
English people of Italian descent
21st-century English actresses
Child pop musicians
British child singers
National Youth Theatre members
21st-century British women  singers